Bodil Victoria Arnesen (19 April 1967 in Harstad) is a Norwegian operatic soprano who studied music in Stavanger and Munich.

Arnesen has had opera and concert engagements in Europe, USA and Asia and has recorded several albums. She has been awarded several music awards.

Prizes 
1989: Princess Astrid Music Prize
1990: ARD International Music Competition
1991: Kirsten Flagstad Prize 
1994: Mirjam Helin International singing competition 
2000: Griegprisen

Discography (selection) 
1994: Alnæs: Songs 
1997: Grieg: Songs
1998: Sinding: Songs 
2000: Julens Beste
2001: Det er jul
2003: Fader Vår, mine beste salmer
2006: Con Sentimento 
2009: Voice in the air

References

External links 
  Die verschwiegene Nachtgall (The Nightingale's secret) Edward Grieg on YouTube 
 Bodil Arnesen on Naxos Records
 Bodil Arnesen on Dacapo Records

People from Harstad
1967 births
Living people
University of Stavanger alumni
Norwegian expatriates in Germany
Norwegian operatic sopranos
20th-century Norwegian women opera singers
21st-century Norwegian women opera singers